Aftershocks: A Memoir is a 2020 memoir book by Nadia Owusu, published by Simon & Schuster, which won the 2019 nonfiction Whiting Award. The book is a memoir covering personal, political and historical levels related to the author's origins and itinerant upbringing in several African and European countries accompanied by her caring although globetrotting father from Ghana. Despite their intense nomadism, her father nurtured her affective and cultural bonding to their Asante ethnic roots in Central Africa, where they traveled every year to visit relatives and friends. The memoir spans her early childhood to her late twenties. Having been abandoned by her Armenian mother when she was 2 years old, Nadia orphaned from her father when she was 13, following which she  battles over the years to summon a historically contextualized, confident self as a young adult to gain socially minded, high level education and employment in the United States.

Reception 
The book was reviewed by The New York Times, The Guardian, The Washington Post, and NPR.

References 

2020 non-fiction books
Memoirs
English-language books
Simon & Schuster books